Bernoullia is a genus of tropical trees in the mallow family, Malvaceae. It was established by English botanist Daniel Oliver in 1873. There are three accepted species, which occur from Mexico to Colombia.
Bernoullia flammea
Bernoullia jaliscana
Bernoullia uribeana

Nuclear DNA studies suggest that Bernoullia and the genera Gyranthera and Huberodendron form a sister clade to a core Bombacoideae clade. Members of this genus have indehiscent fruits — that is, they do not split open when ripe to release their seeds. The staminal filaments of the flowers are fused into a tube, with the unstalked anthers located near the tube's apex. The pollen is somewhat triangular in shape, with furrows and/or pores on the surface.

References

Bombacoideae
Malvaceae genera